The 1993 Michigan State Spartans football team competed on behalf of Michigan State University as a member of the Big Ten Conference during the 1993 NCAA Division I-A football season. Led by 11th-year head coach George Perles, the Spartans compiled an overall record of 6–6 with a mark of 4–4 in conference play. The Spartans went 6–6 overall and 4–4 in conference play, placing seventh in the Big Ten. Michigan State was invited to the 1993 Liberty Bowl and was defeated by Louisville, 18–7. The team played  home games at Spartan Stadium in East Lansing, Michigan.

Schedule

Roster

Game summaries

Michigan

1994 NFL Draft
The following players were selected in the 1994 NFL Draft.

References

Michigan State
Michigan State Spartans football seasons
Michigan State Spartans football